Liam Burns was President of the National Union of Students in the United Kingdom. He took office on 1 July 2011, succeeding outgoing President Aaron Porter. Burns stood for NUS President as an independent but is a member of the Labour Party.

Career 
Burns studied physics at Heriot-Watt University before being elected as Vice-President [Education & Welfare] (2006 - 2007) and subsequently President (2007 - 2008) of the university's Students' Association.
While at Heriot Watt he was a member of the rowing club 

He went on to serve as NUS Scotland's Deputy President from 2008 - 2009 and as the organisation's President in 2009 - 2010 and again in 2010 - 2011, before being elected as NUS President in 2011.

Burns, who supported the idea of a graduate tax to finance education in England, Wales and Northern Ireland, was re-elected by delegates at NUS National Conference in April 2012 after running on a manifesto criticising government cuts to education.

After leaving NUS in 2013, Burns has worked with The Scout Association, most recently as Chief Programme Officer.

He has been named the Executive Commissioner and Chief Executive Officer of Scouts Canada effective 1 May 2023.

References

 

 

Presidents of the National Union of Students (United Kingdom)
Alumni of Heriot-Watt University
Labour Party (UK) people
Living people
1984 births